1983 Beirut bombing may refer to:
1983 United States embassy bombing
1983 Beirut barracks bombings

See also 
 Beirut bombings (disambiguation)